Michael Struwe (born 6 October 1955 in Wuppertal) is a German mathematician who specializes in calculus of variations and nonlinear partial differential equations. He won the 2012 Cantor medal from the Deutsche Mathematiker-Vereinigung for "outstanding achievements in the field of geometric analysis, calculus of variations and nonlinear partial differential equations".

He studied mathematics at the University of Bonn, gaining his PhD in 1980 with the title Infinitely Many Solutions for Superlinear, Anticoercive Elliptic Boundary Value Problems without Oddness.  He took research positions in Paris and at ETH Zürich before gaining his habilitation in Bonn in 1984. Since 1986, he has been working at ETH Zürich, initially as an assistant professor, becoming a full professor in 1993. His specialisms included nonlinear partial differential equations and calculus of variations.

He is joint editor of the journals Calculus of Variations, Commentarii Mathematici Helvetici, International Mathematical Research Notices and Mathematische Zeitschrift.

His publications include the book Variational methods (Applications to nonlinear PDE and Hamiltonian systems) (Springer-Verlag, 1990), which was praised by Jürgen Jost as "very useful" with an "impressive range of often difficult examples".

Struwe was awarded a Gauss Lecture by the German Mathematical Society in 2011. In 2012, Struwe was selected as one of the inaugural fellows of the American Mathematical Society.

Major publications
 
 
 
 
 
 
 Struwe, Michael. On the evolution of harmonic maps in higher dimensions. J. Differential Geom. 28 (1988), no. 3, 485–502. 
 
 
 
 Struwe, Michael; Tarantello, Gabriella. On multivortex solutions in Chern-Simons gauge theory. Boll. Unione Mat. Ital. Sez. B Artic. Ric. Mat. (8) 1 (1998), no. 1, 109–121.

References

External links
 page at ETH

1955 births
20th-century German mathematicians
Academic staff of ETH Zurich
Living people
Fellows of the American Mathematical Society
21st-century German mathematicians